South is an impact crater in the Mare Australe quadrangle of Mars, located at 76.9°S  latitude and 21.9°E  longitude. It measures  in diameter, and was named after British astronomer Sir James South (1785–1867). The name was approved by the International Astronomical Union (IAU) Working Group for Planetary System Nomenclature in 1973.

Description 
Very close to the crater there are what have been named "Swiss cheese" features. Swiss cheese features (SCFs) are pits so named because they look like the holes in Swiss cheese. They were first seen in 2000 using Mars Orbiter Camera imagery. They tend to have similar bean-like shapes with a cusp pointing towards the south pole. The angle of the sun probably contributes to their roundness. Near the Martian summer solstice, the sun can remain continuously just above the horizon; as a result the walls of a round depression will receive more intense sunlight, and sublimate much more rapidly than the floor. The walls sublimate and recede, while the floor remains the same.

As the seasonal frost disappears, the pit walls appear to darken considerably relative to the surrounding terrain.

Gallery

See also
 List of craters on Mars

References 

Mare Australe quadrangle
Impact craters on Mars